is a Japanese footballer currently playing as a midfielder for FC Ryukyu from 2023, on loan from Shonan Bellmare.

Career
Hiramatsu begin first youth career with Shimizu S-Pulse until 2016, later he was entry to Rissho University from 2017 until he was graduation in 2020.

After Graduation, Hiramatsu sign first professional contract with Shonan Bellmare in 2020.

Hiramatsu was loaned out to J2 club, Zweigen Kanazawa for during 2021 season.

On 28 December 2022, Hiramatsu loaned again to J3 relegated club, FC Ryukyu for upcoming 2023 season.

Career statistics

Club
.

Notes

References

External links

1998 births
Living people
Association football people from Shizuoka Prefecture
Rissho University alumni
Japanese footballers
Association football midfielders
J1 League players
J2 League players
J3 League players
Shonan Bellmare players
Zweigen Kanazawa players
FC Ryukyu players